Raymond "Chappy" Charles (March 25, 1881 – August 4, 1959) was an infielder in Major League Baseball. He played for the St. Louis Cardinals and Cincinnati Reds.

References

External links

1881 births
1959 deaths
Major League Baseball infielders
St. Louis Cardinals players
Cincinnati Reds players
Williamsport Millionaires players
Matanzas players
Milwaukee Brewers (minor league) players
San Francisco Seals (baseball) players
Baseball players from New Jersey
People from Phillipsburg, New Jersey
Sportspeople from Warren County, New Jersey
American expatriate baseball players in Cuba
20th-century African-American people